Bhandit Thongdee (born  March 1, 1971) is a Thai film director, screenwriter and producer. His films include Mercury Man and The Unborn.

Filmography

Director 
 Hoedown Showdown (2002)
 Soul Under Bed (2003)
 The Unborn The Mother (2003)
 Mercury Man (2006)

Screenwriter 
 The Unborn a.k.a. The Mother (2003)

External links

1971 births
Bhandit Thongdee
Bhandit Thongdee
Living people